José Manuel Rafael Simeón de Mier y Terán (February 18, 1789 — July 3, 1832), generally known as  Manuel de Mier y Terán, was a noted military and political figure during the Mexican War of Independence and during the era of the First Republic serving in the Mexican congress and as Minister of War. He made an inspection of Texas on behalf of the government and was placed in charge of securing the area after the Mexican government banned further American immigration in 1830. 

He was at one point considered a potential candidate for the Mexican presidency. However, health problems and despair over the nation's political situation drove him to commit suicide in 1832 during a revolution against the government of Anastasio Bustamante.

Early career
Mier y Terán studied at Mexico City's School of Mines before the outbreak of the insurgency for independence in 1810. He joined the insurgents in 1812 and rose to a leadership position. He was one of the few American-born Spaniards to fight on the side of the insurgency, serving under José María Morelos until Morelos's death in 1815.  Following independence, he was elected to the First Mexican Congress as the representative for Chiapas and served on its committee for the colonization of unoccupied territory. Two years later, he made brigadier general and served as Minister of War under President Guadalupe Victoria, although he resigned within nine months over differences with the administration. He served with Antonio López de Santa Anna in repelling the Spanish reconquest of Mexico in 1829.

He then served as State Inspector at Veracruz, part of a Mexican mission to England, and director of the Mexican School of Artillery until 1827. The same year, he went to Tamaulipas and Texas.

Inspection of Texas
After gaining the rank of general, Terán headed an expedition to inspect Texas. His main charges were to inspect the boundary between Texas and the United States, make a record of natural resources, and evaluate a policy of preference for European settlement of Texas.

Terán assembled a team of scientists and military advisors and led them first to Laredo in 1828. He recorded a narrative of this trip in his diary, while two members of his expeditionJosé María de Sánchez y Tapia and Jean Louis Berlandiermaintained their own diaries. They continued and made stops in San Antonio, San Felipe and Gonzales. While they attempted to continue their journey to Nacogdoches, however, illnesses and broken equipment plagued the expedition as they struggled to pull thir wagons over poor roads. When they reached the Trinity River, selected just eight men to cross the river with their horses. He sent the rest of the men back with all the wagons and most of the equipment.

Commandant
After returning to Mexico, General Terán served as second in command to Santa Anna during his defense of Tampico against the Spanish invasion of 1829. He participated in the Capitulation of Pueblo Viejo. Their success made them both national heroes. Considered a strong candidate for president, he lost his chance when Santa Anna and Zavala's coup d'etat briefly gave the position to Vicente Guerrero. The next year, another coup elevated Anastasio Bustamante, who named Mier y Terán as his commandant general for the northeastern provinces, giving Terán military and civil authority over the provinces of Coahuila y Tejas, Nuevo León, and Tamaulipas.

Headquartered at the recently renamed city of Matamoros, he arrived in Galveston Bay in November 1831, to review the port of Anahuac and install the Serb George Fisher as its new customs agent. Texian scofflaws had been smuggling and evading taxes, so he granted Fisher authority over the mouth of the Brazos River, as well. The general instructed John Bradburn to enforce title fees and remove an unauthorized ayuntamiento installed at Liberty. These administrative changes led directly to the Anahuac Disturbances, an uprising that was a precursor to the 1836 Texas Revolution.

In 1832, during the uprising against president Anastasio Bustamante known as Plan of Veracruz Mier y Teran attempted to suppress the rebels only to be routed by the forces of Esteban Moctezuma. This made Teran increasingly desolate over the future of the nation. He was one of the creole elites who felt that they had failed in the post-independence period to forge a nation. As commander in Texas, he saw the northern region slipping away to the Anglo-Americans, and he became increasingly worried about another Spanish attempt to reconquer Mexico.  He wrote, "I believe that the Spaniards can only cause us temporary damages; the serious and permanent ones are reserved for our own hands, and those of the North American neighbors." He also wrote Lucas Alamán the day before he ended his life, asking how Mexico could hold Texas if they could not stop killing each other. In despair, on July 3, he committed a highly symbolic suicide by throwing himself on his sword in Padilla, Tamaulipas. It was the same location where Emperor Agustín de Iturbide had been executed in 1824, following his return from exile by the men of General Felipe de la Garza Cisneros. Mier y Terán's remains were buried with Iturbide's as were his wishes.  In 1838, when the emperor's bones were re-interred in Mexico City.

Family
General Terán was the youngest of the three sons of Manuel de Mier y Terán and his wife María Ignacia de Teruel y Llanos.

Legacy
The city of General Terán in Nuevo León, Mexico, is named in his honor. Ciudad Mier, Tamaulipas, however, was named after Francisco Mier y Torre, the governor of Nuevo León from 1710 to 1714.

He was also the namesake of Fort Terán on the Neches River in modern Tyler County, Texas.

See also
Fort Tenoxtitlán, established 1813

References

Further reading
Cedeño, Reynaldo Sordo. "Manuel de Mier y Terán y la insurgencia en Tehuacán." Historia Mexicana (2009): 137-194.
Morton, Ohland. "Life of General Don Manuel de Mier y Teran: As It Affected Texas-Mexican Relations." The Southwestern Historical Quarterly 46.1 (1942): 22-47.
Morton, Ohland. "Life of General Don Manuel de Mier y Terán: As It Affected Texas-Mexican Relations (Continued)." The Southwestern Historical Quarterly 47.2 (1943): 120-142.
Morton, Ohland. "Life of General Don Manuel de Mier y Terán: As It Affected Texas-Mexican Relations (Continued)." The Southwestern Historical Quarterly 48.2 (1944): 193-218.
Morton, Ohland. "Life of General Don Manuel de Mier y Terán: As It Affected Texas-Mexican Relations (Concluded)." The Southwestern Historical Quarterly 48.4 (1945): 499-546.
Morton, Ohland. Terán and Texas: A Chapter in Texas-Mexican Relations. Austin: Texas State Historical Association 1948.
Ortiz Peralta, Rina. "MANUEL DE MIER Y TERAN: LAS FRONTERAS DE LA NACION." Istoriya 2.6 (2011).
Rosenberg, Ana Flaschner. D. Manuel de Mier y Terán durante la Revolución de Independencia. Universidad Nacional Autónoma de México, México, 1964.
Mier y Terán, Manuel de, and Jean Louis Berlandier. "Proceedings of the Commission on limits to the orders of General Manuel de Miery Teran." (1832).
Terán y Mier, Manuel de. Texas by Terán: The diary kept by General Manuel de Mier y Terán on his 1828 inspection of Texas. trans. John Wheat. Austin: University of Texas Press 2000.

External sources
 
 McKeehan, Wallace. Manuel de Mier y Terán 1789-1832. Sons of DeWitt Colony, Texas, Website.

1789 births
1832 deaths
People of the Mexican War of Independence
People of Mexican side in the Texas Revolution
Mexican generals
People from Mexico City
Suicides by sharp instrument in Mexico